Alexander Volchkov may refer to:

 Alexander Volchkov (dancer), a principal dancer for the Bolshoi Ballet
 Alexander Volchkov (ice hockey, born 1952), Soviet ice hockey player
 Alexander Volchkov (ice hockey, born 1977), Russian professional ice hockey player
 Alexander Volchkov (jurist) (1902–1978), Soviet alternate judge at the Nuremberg Trials